is a Japanese four-panel comedy manga series by Kazusa Yoneda. It was serialized in Ichijinsha's seinen manga magazine Manga 4-Koma Palette from June 2011 to September 2021. The series received an anime adaptation, which aired from July to September 2015.

Plot
The story revolves around Haruki Nakano and his four sisters: Mutsuki, Yayoi, Uzuki, and Satsuki. While they may seem monotonous aside from the fact that Haruki's sisters do not give him a single opportunity to rest, lecturing him about every perceived mistake and playing tricks on him, he still loves his life.

Characters

 Haruki is the only boy among the Nakano siblings and the second oldest. He attends high school as a first-year student. He chose a high school close to home so he could go home and play video games.

Haruki's older sister with the long black hair. She is very popular at school and has top grades, but acts carefree when she is around Haruki, leading their schoolmates to think they are a couple. She takes care of the household cooking and chores.

Haruki's younger sister by a year. She is in her third-year of middle school. She has short brown hair. She is athletic and is often violent towards Haruki, calling him Baka-Eroki (stupid pervert). She wants to make sure Haruki projects a proper image at school.

The more active and outgoing of Haruki's younger twin sisters. She has short pink hair. She likes to tease and play pranks on Haruki. She is a third-year elementary school student.

The quieter of Haruki's younger twin sisters. She has dark hair styled in twin tails. She shares his interest in anime and manga but is fonder still of her twin. She enjoys reading manga and watching anime. She too is in her third year of elementary school.

Media

Manga
Danchigai, written and illustrated by Kazusa Yoneda, was serialized in Ichijinsha's Manga 4-Koma Palette magazine from June 22, 2011 to September 22, 2021. A number of online chapters of the series were also released on Ichijinsha's website.

Volume list
The series has been collected into the following tankōbon volumes.

Anime
An anime series based on the manga was directed by Hiroshi Kimura, with animation by the animation studio Creators in Pack, and was produced by Dream Creation, with audio production by Dax Production. Eriko Itō was in charge of character design, and Masakatsu Oomuro served as the series sound director. The series has four theme songs, one for each female lead. Satomi Akesaka sings "Early Morning", Mikako Komatsu sings "Let a good day", Sora Tokui sings "Gently Mischief", and Sayaka Horino sings "Princess Durandal".

The series, comprising twelve five-minute episodes, aired from July 10, to September 25, 2015 on TV Saitama, KBS, Sun TV, AT-X, and tvk. The series is streamed by Crunchyroll worldwide except for Japan.  It was released on Blu-ray in Japan on September 18, 2015.

Episode list

Works cited
 "Ch." is shortened form for chapter and refers to a chapter number of the Danchigai manga
 "Ep." is shortened form for episode and refers to an episode number of the Danchigai anime

Notes

References

External links
 Danchigai official manga website 
 Danchigai official anime website 

Anime series based on manga
Comedy anime and manga
Creators in Pack
Crunchyroll anime
Ichijinsha manga
Seinen manga
Yonkoma